Giorgio Mignaty (Cephalonia, June 23, 1824 – Florence, 1895) was an Italian-Greek painter.

Biography
He studied in Rome under Tommaso Minardi and Ferdinando Silvani, and lived for many years in Florence, where he painted many sacred and historic subjects. Among his works is a large canvases: Markos Botsaris (1864); La vittoria dei patriota di Suli contro i Turchi (1879); An episode of the Inquisition of Spain; and La prima onda (First Wave) that depicts God separating water from chaos. He was also known for genre portraits of Hellenic and Ottoman subjects. He was named Knight of the Order of the Savior of Greece and of the Order of the Crown of Italy. One of his pupils was Elizabeth Otis Lyman Duveneck. Mignaty painted the drawing room of Casa Guidi in Florence, the house of Robert and Elizabeth Barrett Browning.

References

1824 births
1895 deaths
People from Argostoli
19th-century Italian painters
Italian male painters
Greek painters
19th-century Italian male artists